Tori Butler-Hart is an English actress, writer and producer. She is best known for her work on the films, Infinitum: Subject Unknown, The Unfamiliar and The Isle.

Tori is the co-founder, along with her husband, Matthew Butler-Hart, of the Fizz and Ginger Films.

Filmography

As actress

 2021 – Infinitum: Subject Unknown
 2020 – The Unfamiliar
 2019 – Real
 2018 – Transference
 2018 – The Isle
 2017 – The Forsaken
 2017 – Edie
 2017 – Suicide Feast
 2016 – PHARE
 2016 – Switch Off
 2015 – Two Down
 2014 – Keeping Rosy
 2014 – Miss in Her Teens

 2013 – Cracks
 2012 – The Humpersnatch Case
 2012 – The Academy: Special
 2011 – Blog Off
 2011 – Claude et Claudette
 2010 – E'gad, Zombies!
 2009–2013 – Doctors

Publications 
 2021 - Full to the Brim with Fizz, Ginger, and Fierce Determination

Awards and nominations

References

External links 

 

Living people
English television actresses
21st-century English actresses
Actresses from London
Year of birth missing (living people)